Rezence (pronounced reh-zense) is an interface standard developed by the Alliance for Wireless Power (A4WP) for wireless electrical power transfer based on the principles of magnetic resonance. The Rezence system consists of a single power transmitter unit (PTU) and one or more power receiver units (PRUs). The interface standard supports power transfer up to 50 watts, at distances up to 5 centimeters. The power transmission frequency is 6.78 MHz, and up to eight devices can be powered from a single PTU depending on transmitter and receiver geometry and power levels. A Bluetooth Low Energy link is defined in the A4WP system intended for control of power levels, identification of valid loads and protection of non-compliant devices.

The A4WP was formed in early 2012 with the intent to create a wireless power transfer standard to compete with the existing Qi standard. Board member companies include Broadcom, Gill Electronics, Integrated Device Technology (IDT), Intel, Qualcomm, Samsung Electronics, Samsung Electro-Mechanics, and WiTricity.

See also 
 Cordless
 WiPower
 Contactless energy transfer
 Inductive coupling
 Near field communication
 Bluetooth Smart
 Open Dots, a conductive charging standard promoted by Open Dots Alliance

References

External links
 – official site
 – official site of Bluetooth Smart technology

Interfaces
Wireless energy transfer
Energy development
Wireless transmitters
Open standards